Julie Fabre (born 27 June 1976) is a retired French synchronized swimmer who competed in the 1996 Summer Olympics.

References

1976 births
Living people
Sportspeople from Nice
French synchronized swimmers
Olympic synchronized swimmers of France
Synchronized swimmers at the 1996 Summer Olympics